The Neo-Indian Attack is a chess opening that begins with the moves:

1. d4 Nf6 
2. c4 e6 
3. Bg5

This opening is also known as the Seirawan Attack, after top 1980s player Yasser Seirawan.

Description
The pinning of the f6-knight looks similar to the Torre Attack, but while the Torre is fairly common, the Neo-Indian is rarely played. The move order has been used by players such as David Janowski against Edward Lasker in New York City 1922. The opening has been considered possible opening surprise in the Secrets of Opening Surprises series.

The most common responses from Black are:
3...h6 which  the bishop to move again, and unlike the Trompowsky Attack, 4.Bxf6 will not leave Black with doubled pawns.
3...Bb4+ which can transpose to the Leningrad Variation of the Nimzo-Indian Defense after 4.Nc3, or lead to unique variations after 4.Nd2.
3...c5 4.d5
3...Be7

Unless the game transposes to another variation, the Neo-Indian is classified as E00 by the Encyclopaedia of Chess Openings.

References

Chess openings